The Chinese Elm cultivar Ulmus parvifolia 'Dynasty' is a United States National Arboretum introduction reputed to be very fast-growing.

Description
A medium tree rarely exceeding 13 m in height, with a spread of similar dimension producing a very rounded shape. Opinions of the tree's aesthetic merit vary; Dirr  considered that the tree "borders on a boondoggle" whereas Warren  and Jacobson   thought the shape 'good', and the foliage a  decent autumn colour (the leaves turn orange-yellow).

Pests and diseases
The species and its cultivars are highly resistant, but not immune, to Dutch elm disease, and unaffected by the Elm Leaf Beetle Xanthogaleruca luteola. Moreover, the tree's foliage was adjudged "resistant" to Black Spot by the Plant Diagnostic Clinic of the University of Missouri .

Cultivation
The tree is largely limited to North America, although it has been introduced to Italy.

Accessions

North America

Bartlett Tree Experts, US. Acc. nos. 87-1060/1/2, 2004-326, 2004-336
Dawes Arboretum , Newark, Ohio, US. 2 trees, no acc. details available.
Missouri Botanical Garden, St. Louis, Missouri, US. Acc. nos. 1986-1899, 1986-0901.
Scott Arboretum, US. Acc. no. 97-689
Smith College, US. Acc. nos. 2102, 4903
U S National Arboretum , Washington, D.C., US. Acc. no. 63502
J.C. Raulston Arboretum, North Carolina State University, Raleigh, North Carolina, US.

Nurseries

North America

Boyd Coffey & Sons, Nurseries, Inc. Lenoir, North Carolina, US.
Sun Valley Garden Centre , Eden Prairie, Minnesota, US.

Europe
UmbraFlor , Spello, Italy. As Ulmus 'Dinasty'.
Van Den Berk (UK) Ltd., London, UK

References

External links
http://www.ces.ncsu.edu/depts/hort/consumer/factsheets/trees-new/cultivars/ulmus_parvifolia.htm Ulmus parvifolia cultivar list.
https://web.archive.org/web/20030413074605/http://fletcher.ces.state.nc.us/programs/nursery/metria/metria11/warren/elm.htm Return of the Elm - the status of elms in the nursery industry in 2000. Warren, K., J. Frank Schmidt and Co.

Chinese elm cultivar
Ulmus articles with images
Ulmus